The 21st BRDC International Trophy was a non-championship Formula One race held at Silverstone on 30 March 1969. The race was run over 52 laps of the circuit and was won by Jack Brabham in a Brabham BT26A.

Race report
Jackie Stewart qualified the Matra MS80 on pole, but opted to drive the previous season's MS10 and so started from the back of the grid. Jack Brabham led from start to finish, but suffered from fuel starvation in the closing stages and finished only seconds ahead of Jochen Rindt, who had suffered from water in the ignition system at the start and dropped back to tenth place, subsequently setting fastest lap in his Lotus 49B as he worked his way through the field. Jackie Stewart finished third, narrowly ahead of Jacky Ickx.

Classification

Qualifying

Race

References

BRDC International Trophy
BRDC International Trophy
BRDC
BRDC International Trophy